Xestospiza fastigialis is an extinct species of bird with a ridge-shape bill that was described on the basis of fossils. It was possibly an insectivore, populating the Hawaiian Islands of Oahu, Molokai and Maui.

See also
Xestospiza conica

References

Further reading

External links
ornitaxa.com entry

Hawaiian honeycreepers
Late Quaternary prehistoric birds
Extinct birds of Hawaii
Prehistoric birds of Oceania
Fossils of the United States
Holocene extinctions 
Fossil taxa described in 1991
Taxa named by Helen F. James